Standard Bosnian, Croatian, Montenegrin, and Serbian are different national variants and official registers of the pluricentric Serbo-Croatian language.

History 
In socialist Yugoslavia, the language was approached as a pluricentric language with two regional normative varieties—Eastern (used in Serbia, Montenegro, and Bosnia and Herzegovina by all ethnicities, either with the Ekavian or the Ijekavian accent) and Western (used in Croatia by all ethnicities, the Ijekavian accent only). However, due to discontent in Croatian intellectual circles, beginning in the late 1960s Croatian cultural workers started to refer to the language exclusively as 'the Croatian literary language', or sometimes 'the Croatian or Serbian language', as was common before Yugoslavia. Bolstered with the 1967 Declaration on the Name and Status of the Croatian Literary Language, these two names were subsequently prescribed in the Croatian constitution of 1974. The language was regarded as one common language with different variants and dialects. The unity of the language was emphasised, making the differences not an indicator of linguistic divisions, but rather factors enriching the 'common language' diversity. West European scientists judge the Yugoslav language policy as an exemplary one: although three-quarters of the population spoke one language, no single language was official on a federal level. Official languages were declared only at the level of constituent republics and provinces,

With the breakup of the Federation, in search of additional indicators of independent and separate national identities, language became a political instrument in virtually all of the new republics. With a boom of neologisms in Croatia, an additional emphasis on Turkisms in the Muslim parts of Bosnia and a privileged position of the Cyrillic script in Serb-inhabited parts of the new states, every state and entity showed a 'nationalisation' of the language. The language in Bosnia started developing independently after Bosnia and Herzegovina declared independence in 1992. The independent development of the language in Montenegro became a topic among some Montenegrin academics in the 1990s.

Serbian and Bosnian standards varieties tend to be inclusive, i.e. to accept a wider range of idioms and to use loanwords (German and Turkish), whereas the Croatian language policy is more purist and prefers neologisms to loan-words, as well as the re-use of neglected older words. Yet there is criticism of the puristic language policy even in Croatia, as exemplified by linguist Snježana Kordić. In 2017, numerous prominent writers, scientists, journalists, activists and other public figures from Bosnia and Herzegovina, Croatia, Montenegro and Serbia signed the Declaration on the Common Language, faced with "the negative social, cultural and economic consequences of political manipulations of language in the current language policies of the four countries", which "include using language as an argument justifying the segregation of schoolchildren in some multiethnic environments, unnecessary 'translation' in administration or the media, inventing differences where they do not exist, bureaucratic coercion, as well as censorship (and necessarily also self-censorship), where linguistic expression is imposed as a criterion of ethnonational affiliation and a means of affirming political loyalty".

Despite the 'nationalisation' of the language in the four countries, "lexical differences between the ethnic variants are extremely limited, even when compared with those between closely related Slavic languages (such as standard Czech and Slovak, Bulgarian and Macedonian), and grammatical differences are even less pronounced. More importantly, complete understanding between the ethnic variants of the standard language makes translation and second language teaching impossible", which all means that it is still a pluricentric language. "An examination of all the major 'levels' of language show that BCS is clearly a single language with a single grammatical system."

Writing

Script 
Though all of the language variants could theoretically use either, the scripts differ:
Bosnian and Montenegrin officially use both the Latin and Cyrillic scripts, but the Latin one is more in widespread use.
Croatian exclusively uses the Latin alphabet.
Serbian uses both the Cyrillic and Latin scripts. Cyrillic is the official script of the administration in Serbia and Republika Srpska, but the Latin script is the most widely used in media and especially on the Internet.

Phonemes 
All standard variants have the same set of 30 regular phonemes, so the Bosnian/Croatian/Serbian Latin and Serbian Cyrillic alphabets map one to one with one another and with the phoneme inventory.

There are even several proposals by Croatian linguists for an orthography reform concerning these two diphthongs, but they have not been seriously considered for implementation.

However, in other words, especially those of foreign origin,  is mandatory.

The same happened with their voiced counterparts, i.e. 
and 
merged into . As result, speakers of those dialects often have difficulties distinguishing these sounds.

Orthography 
The Serbian variety usually phonetically transcribes foreign names and words (although both transcription and transliteration are allowed), whereas the Croatian standard usually transliterates. Bosnian accepts both models, but transliteration is often preferred.

Also, when the subject of the future tense is omitted, producing a reversal of the infinitive and auxiliary "ću", only the final "i" of the infinitive is orthographically elided in Croatian and Bosnian, whereas in Serbian the two have merged into a single word:
 "Uradit ću to." (Croatian/Bosnian)
 "Uradiću to." (Serbian/Montenegrin)

Grammar

Accentuation 
In general, the Shtokavian dialects that represent the foundation of the four standard varieties have four pitch accents on stressed syllables: falling tone on a short vowel, written e.g.  in dictionaries; rising tone on a short vowel, written e.g. ; falling tone on a long vowel, written e.g. ; and rising tone on a long vowel, written e.g. . In addition, the following unstressed vowel may be either short, or long, . In declension and verb conjugation, accent shifts, both by type and position, are very frequent.

The distinction between four accents and preservation of post accent lengths is common in vernaculars of western Montenegro, Bosnia and Herzegovina, in parts of Serbia, as well as in parts of Croatia with a strong Serb presence.

The northern vernaculars in Serbia also preserve the four-accent system, but the unstressed lengths have been shortened or disappeared in some positions. However, the shortening of post-accent lengths is in progress in all Shtokavian vernaculars, even in those most conservative in Montenegro. Stress shift to enclitics is, however, in northern Serbia rare and mostly limited to negative verb constructs (ne znam = I don't know > ).

The situation in Croatia, is however, different. A large proportion of speakers of Croatian, especially those coming from Zagreb, do not distinguish between rising and falling accents. This is considered to be a feature of the Zagreb dialect, which has strong Kajkavian influence, rather than standard Croatian.

Regardless of vernacular differences, all three standard varieties exclusively promote the Neo-Shtokavian four-accentual system. Both dialects that are considered to be the basis of standard Serbian (Eastern Herzegovinian and Šumadija-Vojvodina dialects) have four accents.

Phonetics

Morphology 
There are three principal "pronunciations" (izgovori/изговори) of the Shtokavian dialect that differ in their reflexes of the Proto-Slavic vowel jat. Illustrated by the Common Slavic word for "child", dětę, they are:
 dite in the Ikavian pronunciation
 dijete in the Ijekavian pronunciation
 dete in the Ekavian pronunciation

The Serbian language recognises Ekavian and Ijekavian as equally valid pronunciations, whereas Croatian and Bosnian accept only the Ijekavian pronunciation. In Bosnia and Herzegovina (regardless of the official language) and in Montenegro, the Ijekavian pronunciation is used almost exclusively.

Ikavian pronunciation is nonstandard, and is limited to dialectal use in Dalmatia, Lika, Istria, central Bosnia (area between Vrbas and Bosna), Western Herzegovina, Bosanska Krajina, Slavonia and northern Bačka (Vojvodina). So, for example:

A few Croatian linguists have tried to explain the following differences in morphological structure for some words, with the introduction of a new vowel, "jat diphthong". This is not the opinion of most linguists.

Sometimes this leads to confusion: Serbian poticati (to stem from) is in Croatian and Bosnian "to encourage". Croatian and Bosnian "to stem from" is potjecati, whereas Serbian for "encourage" is podsticati.

Standard Bosnian allows both variants, and ambiguities are resolved by preferring the Croatian variant; this is a general practice for Serbian–Croatian ambiguities.

The phoneme /x/ (written as h) has been volatile in eastern South Slavic dialects. In Serbian and some Croatian dialects (including some of those in Slavonia), it has been replaced with /j/, /v/, or elided, and subsequent standardisation sanctioned those forms:

However, /x/ and /f/ have been kept in many words as a distinct feature of Bosnian speech and language tradition, particularly under influence of Turkish and Arabic, and even introduced in some places where it etymologically did not exist. Those forms were in the mid 1990s also accepted in the orthography of the Bosnian language. However, 2018, in the new issue of the Orthography of the Bosnian language, words without the phoneme /x/ (written as "h") are accepted due to their prevalence in language practice.

Because the Ijekavian pronunciation is common to all official standards, it will be used for examples on this page. Other than this, examples of different morphology are:

Internationalisms 
Also many internationalisms and transliterations are different:

(cf. German organisieren,  konstruieren, analysieren)

Historically, modern-age internationalisms entered Bosnian and Croatian mostly through German and Italian, whereas they entered Serbian through French and Russian, so different localisation patterns were established based on those languages. Also, Greek borrowings came to Serbian directly, but through Latin into Croatian:

Most of terms for chemical elements are different: for international names, Bosnian and Croatian use -ij where Serbian has -ijum (uranij–uranijum). In some native names, Croatian have -ik where Serbian has -(o)nik (kisik–kiseonik 'oxygen', vodik–vodonik 'hydrogen') and Bosnian accepts all variants. Yet others are totally different (dušik–azot 'nitrogen', kositar–kalaj 'tin'). Some element names are the same: srebro (silver), zlato (gold), bakar (copper).

Some other imported words differ by grammatical gender, feminine words having an -a suffix and masculine words having a zero-suffix:

Pronouns 
In Serbian and Bosnian, the pronoun what is što when used as a relative, but šta when used as an interrogative; the latter applies also to relative sentences with interrogative meaning. Croatian uses što in all contexts (but in colloquial speech, "šta" is often used).

This is applicable only to the nominative and the accusative – in all other cases, the standards have the same forms: čega, čemu etc. for što.

In Croatian, the pronoun who has the form tko, whereas in Serbian, Bosnian and Montenegrin it has ko, but again, in colloquial speech, the initial "t" is usually omitted. The declension is the same: kome, koga, etc. In addition, Croatian uses komu as an alternative form in the dative case.

The locative pronoun kamo is only used in Croatian:

Syntax

Infinitive versus subjunctive 
With modal verbs such as ht(j)eti (want) or moći (can), the infinitive is prescribed in Croatian, whereas the construction da (that/to) + present tense is preferred in Serbian. This subjunctive of sorts is possibly an influence of the Balkan sprachbund. Again, both alternatives are present and allowed in Bosnian (the first one is preferred in orthography, the latter is more common in colloquial language).

Here is an example of a yat reflection that is the same in everything but the syntax:
The sentence "I want to do that" could be translated with any of
Hoću to da uradim.
Hoću to učiniti.

This difference partly extends to the future tense, which in Serbo-Croatian is formed in a similar manner to English, using (elided) present of verb "ht(j)eti" → "hoću"/"hoćeš"/… > "ću"/"ćeš"/… as auxiliary verb. Here, the infinitive is formally required in both variants:
Ja ću to uraditi. (I shall do that.)

However, when da+present is used instead, it can additionally express the subject's will or intention to perform the action:
Ja ću to da uradim. (I will do that.)

This form is more frequently used in Serbia and Bosnia. The nuances in meaning between the two constructs can be slight or even lost (especially in Serbian dialects), in similar manner as the shall/will distinction varies across English dialects. Overuse of da+present is regarded as Germanism in Serbian linguistic circles, and it can occasionally lead to awkward sentences.

Interrogative constructs 
In interrogative and relative constructs, standard Croatian prescribes using the interrogative participle li after the verb, whereas standard Serbian also allows forms with da li. (A similar situation exists in French, where a question can be formed either by inversion or using est-ce que, and can be stretched in English with modal verbs):
Možeš li? (Can you?) (Croatian)
Both Možeš li? and Da li možeš? (Can you, Do you can?) are common in Serbian.

In addition, non-standard je li ("Is it?"), usually elided to je l' , is vernacular for forming all kinds of questions, e.g. Je l' možeš?. In standard language, it is used only in questions involving auxiliary verb je (="is"):
Je li moguće? (Is it possible?) (Croatian)
Both Je li moguće? and Da li je moguće? are common in Serbian.

In summary, the English sentence "I want to know whether I'll start working" would typically read:
Želim da znam hoću li početi da radim. (spoken Serbian)
Želim znati hoću li početi raditi. (spoken Croatian)

although many in-between combinations could be met in vernacular speech, depending on speaker's dialect, idiolect, or even mood.

The Croatian avoidance of da li is largely an expression of prescriptivism. In everyday speech in Croatia, da li is used, in fact, extensively, but avoided in written language.

Trebati 
In formal Croatian, verb trebati (need or should) is transitive, as in English. In Serbian and Bosnian, it is impersonal, like the French il faut, or the English construct is necessary (to); the grammatical subject is either omitted (it), or presents the object of needing; the person that needs something is an indirect grammatical object, in the dative case. The latter usage is, however, also encountered in Croatian, especially in spoken form.):

Vocabulary

Examples 

The greatest differences between the standards is in vocabulary. However, most words are well understood, and even occasionally used, in the other standards. In most cases, common usage favours one variant and the other(s) are regarded as "imported", archaic, dialectal, or simply more rarely used.

Note that there are only a few differences that can cause confusion, for example the verb "ličiti" means "to look like" in Serbian and Bosnian, but in Croatian it is "sličiti"; "ličiti" means "to paint (a house)". However, "ličiti" is often used Croatian in the meaning of "to look like".

The word "bilo" means "white" in the Ikavian accent, "pulse" in official Croatian, and "was" in all official languages, although it is not so confusing when pronounced because of different accentuation (bîlo or bílo = white, bı̏lo = pulse, bílo = was).

In Serbian and Bosnian, the word izvanredan (extraordinary) has only the positive meaning (excellent), vanredan being used for "unusual" or "out of order"; however, only izvanredan is used in Croatian in both contexts.

Also note that in most cases Bosnian officially allows almost all of the listed variants in the name of "language richness", and ambiguities are resolved by preferring the Croatian variant. Bosnian vocabulary writers based their decisions on usage of certain words in literary works by Bosnian authors.

Names of the months 
The months have Slavic-derived names in Croatian, wheres Serbian and Bosnian have almost the same set of Latin-derived names as English. The Slavic-derived names may also be used in Bosnian, but the Latinate names are preferred.

The Latin-derived names of the months are well understood in Croatia and are used in several fixed expressions such as Prvi Maj (May 1), Prvi April (April Fools' Day) or Oktobarska revolucija (October Revolution).

In spoken Croatian and in western Bosnia it is common to refer to a month by its number. Therefore, many speakers refer to the month of May as peti mjesec ("the fifth month"). Saying sedmi peti (seventh of fifth) would be the equivalent of May 7.

Miscellaneous 
Pronunciation and vocabulary differs among dialects spoken within Serbia, Croatia and Bosnia themselves. Each larger region has its own pronunciation and it is reasonably easy to guess where a speaker is from by their accent and/or vocabulary. Colloquial vocabulary can be particularly different from the official standards.
This is one of the arguments for claiming it is all one and the same language: there are more differences within the territories of the official languages themselves than there are between the standards (all three of which are based on the same Neo-Štokavian dialect). This is not surprising, of course, for if the lines between the varieties were drawn not politically but linguistically, then there would be no borders at all. As Pavle Ivić explains, the continuous migration of Slavic populations during the five hundred years of Turkish rule has scattered the local dialects all around.
When Bosniaks, Croats, Montenegrins and Serbs talk amongst each other, the other speakers usually understand them completely, save for the odd word, and quite often, they will know what that means (much as with British and American English speakers). Nevertheless, when communicating with each other, there is a habit to use terms that are familiar to everyone, with the intent to avoid not being understood and/or confusion. For example, to avoid confusion with the names of the months, they can be referred to as the "first month", "second month" and so on, or the Latin-derived names can be used if "first month" itself is ambiguous, which makes it perfectly understandable for everyone. In Serbia, the names of the months are the same Latin-derived names as in English so again they are understandable for anyone who knows English or another Western European language.
Even during the time of Yugoslavia it was common for publishers to do some adaptations to "Eastern" or "Western" standard. Especially translations were and are changed by the lectors. It is to be considered that Croatian and Serbian standards have completely different scientific terminology. Carl Jung's masterpiece "Psychology and Alchemy" was translated into Croatian in 1986, and adapted in the late 1990s into Serbian. Ivo Andrić had some problems in Croatia with publishers who changed his infinitive constructions and other expressions. Eventually, he managed to forbid that kind of intervention. In Montenegro, the publisher CID switched from the Ekavian to the Ijekavian accent after Montenegro's independence.

Language samples 
The following samples, taken from article 1 to 6 of the Universal Declaration of Human Rights, are "synonymous texts, translated as literally as possible" in the sense of Ammon designed to demonstrate the differences between the standard varieties treated in this article in a continuous text. However, even when there is a different translation, it does not necessarily mean that the words or expression from other languages do not exist in a respective language, e.g. the words osoba and pravni subjekt exist in all languages, but in this context, the word osoba is preferred in Croatian and Bosnian and the word pravni subjekt is favored in Serbian and Montenegrin. The word vjeroispovijest is mentioned just in the Montenegrin translation, but the same word exists in other standard varieties too - albeit in Serbian in the Ekavian variant veroispovest.

See also 
 Pluricentric Serbo-Croatian language
 Declaration on the Common Language 2017
 Declaration on the Status and Name of the Croatian Literary Language
 Controversy over ethnic and linguistic identity in Montenegro
 Language secessionism in Serbo-Croatian
 Mutual intelligibility
 Standard language
 Abstand and ausbau languages
 Serbo-Croatian
 Shtokavian
 Serbo-Croatian phonology
 South Slavic dialect continuum

References

External links 
 
 

Serbo-Croatian language
Bosnian language
Croatian language
Montenegrin language
Serbian language
Comparison of Slavic languages
Linguistic controversies